John Hosier CBE (18 November 1928 – 28 March 2000) was an English musical educator.  He was born with stunted fingers so was unable to play most musical instruments himself. Later in life, when asked about his hands by children, he said he used to bite his fingernails too much.

Early life 
John Hosier was born in the northwest London suburb of Kingsbury, Middlesex. His father, Harry Hosier, was the co-founder of the building firm Hosier and Dickinson alongside G.W. Dickinson, a Master Builder. His mother, Constance, was a violinist. She overcame the problem of his playing a musical instrument by teaching him to play the xylophone. He attended Fryent Primary School, Kingsbury, Preston Manor County Grammar School, now Preston Manor High School, Wembley and St John's College, Cambridge where he also served as a director of Footlights from 1950–1951.

Career 
Hosier's career began in 1953 when he was appointed as a music producer for BBC Radio for schools, a position he held until 1959. Then from 1960 until 1973 he worked in BBC Television for schools. He was producer of the Schools Television programme Music Time.

From 1973 until 1976, he was the inspector for Inner London Education Authority and the director of the Centre for Young Musicians.

From 1978 until 1989, he was the principal of the Guildhall School of Music and Drama at the Barbican Arts Centre. During the trial of the musician Philip Pickett, it emerged that the parents of one of the students raped by Pickett had written to Hosier to complain. The parents were told to take their child elsewhere for lessons. The following year, the Guildhall awarded Pickett a Fellowship, one of its highest honours.

In 1986, Hosier worked with Leonard Bernstein for the Barbican Centre's Leonard Bernstein Festival. He became a Commander of the Order of the British Empire in 1984. In 1989 he was appointed Director of the Hong Kong Academy for Performing Arts, a position he held for five years until 1993. He was director of the Early Music Centre in London from 1994 until his death in 2000.

He was married to Biddy Baxter, the editor of the BBC's children's television programme Blue Peter for nearly 25 years. In 2003, Baxter established the John Hosier Music Trust which offers scholarships to students to take up post-graduate studies.

References 

1928 births
2000 deaths
Alumni of St John's College, Cambridge
Commanders of the Order of the British Empire
British music educators
English radio producers
English television producers
Academics of the Guildhall School of Music and Drama
People from Kingsbury, London
20th-century English musicians
Presidents of the Independent Society of Musicians